Dzhurkiv is a village in Kolomyia Raion of Ivano-Frankivsk Oblast (province) in western Ukraine. It belongs to Pidhaichyky rural hromada, one of the hromadas of Ukraine.

References

Villages in Kolomyia Raion